The KS-1 or Kaishan-1, military designation HQ-12 is the first Chinese surface-to-air missile to adopt a phased array radar.

Development
HQ-12 prototypes, known as the KS-1 before being incorporated into the PLA service, were developed in the early 1980s. The developer was the state-owned Jiangnan Space Industry, also known as Base 061. The first successful test-firing of the missile prototype was conducted in 1989, and the development was concluded in 1994. Before its completion, the missile was showcased at Paris Airshow in 1991. It was showcased again at the Zhuhai Airshow in 1998. However, none of these showcases resulted in mass production due to the lack of People's Liberation Army (PLA) orders and foreign interests.

The development of the improved variant KS-1A was concluded in the late 1990s, and the finished product was presented in 2001 by China Precision Machinery Import-Export Corporation. The new system included a cross-country chassis and a new multifunction radar. In 2005, Malaysia signed a memorandum of understanding to purchase KS-1A. Testing of the KS-1A was also undertaken by the Chinese PLA, and the system with new military designation HQ-12 was showcased at the 80th-anniversary exhibition of the PLA, indicating its military service. In 2009, the HQ-12 participated in the parade celebrating the 60th anniversary of China.

The KS-1A and improved variants were eventually exported to Myanmar, Turkmenistan, and Thailand. In 2016, the HQ-22, the further development of the HQ-12 system was revealed at Airshow China 2016.

Design

The HQ-12, or KS-1, was the first Chinese air defense system equipped with a phased-array radar. The radar system was constantly improved with each new variant of the missile system. A typical HQ-12 battery includes one passive phased-array radar (PPAR) panel, four launchers fitted with two missiles per launcher, and 16 additional missiles on reload trucks, command-and-control station, and generator units.

The first KS-1 variant used SJ-212 engagement radar, derived from the Russian 30N6E1, which is capable of tracking 50 targets at a range of up to 27 kilometers. The KS-1A has two options: HT-233 with 50 kilometers range and H-200 multifunction radar with 70 kilometers range. KS-1C kept the H-200 radar from KS-1A but replaced rail launchers with canister-launched missiles. Overall, the KS-1 is a rough equivalent of American MIM-23 Hawk, the precursor to the Patriot missile system.

Although the performance of the original KS-1 is obsolete, the HQ-12 (KS-1A) is a more reliable and capable platform primarily designed to destroy aircraft, UAVs, and helicopters. It can also serve as missile defense platform, engaging ballistic and cruise missiles with speeds exceeding Mach 3.

Operational history
The People's Liberation Army (PLA) used KS-1A as the basis for the HQ-12 missile system due to the KS-1A having better performance than the original KS-1.

Variants

KS-1 The initial version with the SJ-202 engagement radar, and the missile seeker has a traditional parabolic antenna and can guide up to two missiles against one target. The range is >40 km. 
KS-1A The new HT-233 radar has a range of 50 km, and engagement altitude is 24 km. It can also use H-200 radar with 70 km range and 27km engagement altitude.
KS-1C Developed by the China Aerospace Science and Industry Corporation (CASIC). Featuring canister-launched missiles. 
HQ-12 Chinese military designation. HQ-12 is based on KS-1A with H-200 radar. 
KS-1M Myanmar's locally made variant of Chinese HQ-12 with TOT under licence. It was unveiled with one battery at the Armed Force Day Parade in 2017. Two surface-to-air missiles are fitted on each locally-made Miltruk chassis. The name of the missile is GYD-1B and also looks a little bit fatter than the Chinese version. But, the maximum range of the missile is unknown. According to the local media, the maximum range of KS-1M is equal to the range of KS-1C's missile.
HQ-22 The HQ-22 (export designation FK-3) is the second-generation variant of the HQ-12, has a range of up to 170km and an effective altitude from 50 m to 27 km. It has a considerably longer range than HQ-12 and serves as an affordable alternative to produce than the HQ-9.

Operators

People's Liberation Army Air Force - 150 as of 2020

Myanmar Army - Seven batteries of KS-1A and locally made KS-1M.

Royal Thai Air Force - KS-1C in service 2016.

Specifications (KS-1)
Weight: 900 kg
Warhead: > 100 kg
Length: 5.6 m
Diameter: 0.4 m
Speed: 1,200 m/s
Maneuverability: > 20 g
Maximum target speed: 750 m/s
Maximum target maneuverability: > 5 g
Maximum range: > 50 km
Minimum range: 100 m
Maximum altitude: > 25 km 
Minimum altitude: < 500 m

Gallery

See also
Akash
Type 3 Chū-SAM
NASAMS
Barak 8
QRSAM
VL-SRSAM

References

External links 

Missile defense
Surface-to-air missiles of the People's Republic of China
Weapons of the People's Republic of China
Military equipment introduced in the 1990s